DeSales Catholic High School is a private, Roman Catholic high school in Walla Walla, Washington. It is located in the Roman Catholic Diocese of Spokane.

Background
DeSales Catholic traces its roots to two high schools, all-girls St. Vincent Academy and St. Patrick's School for Boys. St. Vincent Academy was established by the Sisters of Providence of Vancouver in 1864. St. Patrick's School for Boys was established in 1865 by the Christian Brothers. St. Patrick's was renamed LaSalle Institute in 1899. The two schools merged in 1930. The school moved to its current campus in 1959 and was renamed (Saint Francis) DeSales High School.

External links
  School Website

Notes and references

High schools in Walla Walla County, Washington
Catholic secondary schools in Washington (state)
Educational institutions established in 1864
Education in Walla Walla, Washington
Schools accredited by the Northwest Accreditation Commission
Roman Catholic Diocese of Spokane
1864 establishments in Washington Territory